Nereo Cave is a huge underwater sea-cave situated on the north-west of Sardinia in the Coral riviera of Alghero, Italy. The name was given by the discoverers in honour of the mythological figure Nereus, who is often billed as the Old Man of the Sea, father of the Nereids. The site is under the high limestone cliffs of Capo Caccia, 100 metres north of the famous Neptune's Grotto.

Overview
The cave is considered the biggest marine cave in the Mediterranean Sea. With around 10 entrances, arches and tunnels, it is possible to make dives from 0 to 35 m, through long and large tunnels, air chambers and different ways. The walls are covered with red coral and yellow leptosamnia.

With the other cape of Punta Giglio and the Porto Conte Bay, the cave is part of a  Marine reserve set up in 2003. Its flora and fauna are typically Mediterranean including groupers, lobsters, congers and moray eels, and thriving crustacean life.

See also
Cave diving
List of caves in Italy

References

External links
Related site to Nereo Cave
Wikimapia location
Video on YouTube

Nereo
Landforms of Sardinia
Nereo
Limestone caves
Province of Sassari
Alghero
Tourist attractions in Sardinia
Underwater diving sites in Italy